SinoLatin Capital is a Shanghai-based-merchant bank specializing in private equity and research focused exclusively on cross border transactions between China and Latin America. The firm also provides advisory services related to mergers and acquisitions, corporate restructurings and financings. Additionally, the firm manages a pool capital for private equity investments.

SinoLatin Capital focuses on sectors of strategic importance to Chinese investors, such as oil and gas, mining, agribusiness and forestry. Latin America is a natural resource rich region that produces vast amounts of these commodities, much of which is now being exported to China. Highlighting this growing trend, in 2009 China became Brazil's largest trading partner and has growing trade relationships with many countries of the region.

The firm also produces research on the fundamentals for Sino-Latin trade and provides a thought leadership framework for why the world should expect an increase in foreign direct investment by Chinese companies into Latin America.

The firm was founded in 2009 by Erik Bethel Gonzalez, Luis Gomez-Cobo, Rafael Valdez Mingramm and Jorge Barreda Cruz.

Background
The People's Republic of China instituted its Go Global strategy to encourage its enterprises to invest overseas as China has amassed huge amounts of foreign reserves. In November 2008, the Chinese government unveiled its policy paper on “Latin America and the Caribbean” which was a call to both sides to increase the dialog and person to person exchanges at every level. At the same time, there has been an increase in the frequency of visits by high level Chinese delegations to Latin America and trade agreements signed which lay the groundwork to bridge these two complementary regions together.

Like Africa and Australia before it, Latin America has become of strategic importance as China continues its efforts to secure a long-term supply of commodities to grow its GDP. For example, agriculture in China faces the limitations of having 10% of the world's total arable land support 20% of the world's population, requiring the country to seek secure sources of external food supplies. Additionally, urbanization in China will necessitate that China continue to make large scale strategic investments, whether they be majority or minority stakes in private or public corporations or greenfield projects in the commodities arena. Latin America is a logical place to source commodities like iron ore, copper and soy and recent deal activity highlight this trend. Beyond commodities, China can benefit from an increase in commercial ties in the areas of banking, tourism, manufacturing and infrastructure investments.

History
SinoLatin Capital was founded by three partners, senior investment banker and current CEO Erik Bethel, entrepreneur and current Chairman Luis Gomez Cobo, and founding partner Rafael Valdez Mingramm:
 Bethel previously worked at ChinaVest, the oldest private equity fund in Mainland China and in the Latin American mergers and acquisitions, corporate finance and private equity groups at Morgan Stanley, J.P. Morgan Partners, Emerging Markets Partnership, and Compass Point Capital Partners. He is based in Shanghai, China.
 Cobo co-founded Sinolatin Capital and served as CEO of Los Olivos Alimentos, a leading Mexican agribusiness firm. He has wide experience in making private investments and participating in several enterprises, including Los Olivos Alimentos, Saeta Continental, Figo Transport, Empacadora Zan Alfonso, Nueva Tecnología en Alimentación (Nutec), and Ganaderos Productores de Leche Pura (Alpura).
 Mingramm co-founded SinoLatin Capital and worked at ChinaVest, as a consultant for ProVentures, a financial advisory firm based in New York and advised The Synergos Institute on sustainable development initiatives along the U.S.- Mexico Border. In January 2011, Mingramm left SLC to pursue other ventures.

On May, 2009 Jorge Barreda joined as partner of Sinolatin Capital. Previously he was heading the Andean Region effort at UBS Investment Bank, where he was an Executive Director. Prior to UBS, he was a vice president at Deutsche Bank where he originated capital markets, structured notes and derivatives transactions.

The firm has also befitted from the financial crisis of 2008, as it has allowed boutique investment banking firms such as SinoLatin Capital to hire top talent from bulge bracket investment banks that had been heavily impacted in the crisis.

Private equity
As of March 2010, SinoLatin Capital's subsidiary in China will be a “Private Equity Investment Management Company,” or, in Chinese, . The license allows SinoLatin Capital to raise and manage private equity funds denominated in Chinese RMB. SinoLatin Capital is one of a first foreign financial institutions to be granted the license in China. It now joins a very small group foreign private equity firms with this status, including The Carlyle Group, Blackstone Group and Apax Partners. To date, SinoLatin Capital is also the only Latin America-focused firm that has been approved to manage private equity funds in China.

In 2012, SinoLatin Capital's subsidiary SLIA Investments was appointed to manage a pool of equity and debt capital by the Inter-American Development Bank and China Export Import Bank.

Recent examples in Latin America
The following is a list of notable acquisitions and investments performed by Chinese companies in the area of commodities in Latin America:

 March 2010: East China Mineral Exploration and Development Bureau (ECE) is expected to acquire an iron ore mine in Brazil;
 December 2009: Wuhan Iron & Steel agreed to pay $400 million for a minority state of Brazil's mining company, MMX, under the EBX Group;
 December 2009: Shunde Rixin Development Company acquires 70 percent stake in an iron ore mine in Chile;
 December 2009: China Railway Construction Corp. Ltd. and Tongling Nonferrous Metals Group Holdings Co. offered to buy Corriente Resources Inc. for US$649 million;

References

Investment banks
Financial services companies established in 2009
Banks established in 2009
Companies based in Shanghai
Chinese investment abroad